The golden billion theory is a conspiracy theory that a cabal of global elites are pulling strings to amass wealth for the world's richest billion people at the expense of the rest of humanity. It is popular in the Russian-speaking world.

The term was coined by Anatoly Tsikunov (writing as A. Kuzmich) in his 1990 book The Plot of World Government: Russia and the Golden Billion and used in his articles. The term was quickly popularized by Russian writer Sergey Kara-Murza and has become a staple of contemporary Russian conspiratorial thought.

Details 
The idea of a world with finite resources is not new; the early Christian theologian Tertullian, who lived in 1st–2nd centuries AD wrote: "The strongest witness is the vast population of the earth to which we are a burden and she scarcely can provide for our needs; as our demands grow greater, our complaints against Nature's inadequacy are heard by all. The scourges of pestilence, famine, wars and earthquakes have come to be regarded as a blessing to overcrowded nations since they serve to prune away the luxuriant growth of the human race." Thomas Malthus took this idea further, predicting inevitable Malthusian catastrophes caused by exhaustion of natural resources that would collapse population growth.

According to Kara-Murza, the golden billion (population of developed countries) consumes the lion's share of all resources on the planet. If at least half of the global population begins to consume resources to the same extent, these resources wouldn't be sufficient. This is partly based on the ideas of Malthus, in that emphasis is placed on the scarcity of natural resources. However, whereas Malthus was mostly concerned with finite global crop yields, anti-globalists that advocate the idea of a "golden billion" are mostly concerned with finite natural resources such as fossil fuels and metal.  According to Kara-Murza, the developed countries, while preserving for their nationals a high level of consumption, endorse political, military and economic measures designed to keep the rest of the world in an industrially undeveloped state and as a raw-material appendage area for the dumping of hazardous waste and as a source of cheap labor.

The theory, which holds that the wealth of the West, including that of the lower classes, is mostly based on exploitation of the former colonies in the third world, is not new in Russia, where it was first popularized by Vladimir Lenin, in Imperialism, the Highest Stage of Capitalism. Lenin described the relationship between capitalism and imperialism, wherein the merging of banks and industrial cartels produces finance capital. The final, imperialist stage of capitalism, originates in the financial function of generating greater profits than the home market can yield; thus, business exports (excess) capital, which, in due course, leads to the economic division of the world among international business monopolies, and imperial European states colonising large portions of the world to generate investment profits.

Whereas Lenin and other Marxist anti-imperialists such as Immanuel Wallerstein called for an end to the domination of developed nations through international communism, Kara-Murza and his contemporaries in Russia believe that a restriction of free trade (especially with the West), and various methods of state intervention in the economy is the best solution.  This economic rationale for protectionism dates back to the early United States and is known as the infant industry argument.  The crux of the argument is that nascent industries often do not have the economies of scale that their older competitors from other countries may have, and thus need to be protected until they can attain similar economies of scale. The argument was first explicated by Alexander Hamilton in his 1790 Report on Manufactures, was systematically developed by Daniel Raymond, and was later picked up by Friedrich List in his 1841 work The National System of Political Economy, following his exposure to the idea during his residence in the United States in the 1820s.

According to proponents of the theory, differences in incomes in first-world countries and third-world countries cannot be explained by differences in individual productivity. For example, the Caterpillar (CAT) factory in Tosno, Russia has the highest productivity of all CAT factories in Europe, but the workers are paid about an order of magnitude less. The difference is even more startling when comparing the wages of textile workers in United States factories and in China sweatshops. This means that the multinational corporations appropriate a disproportionally high share of the surplus value in "developing" countries. The argument usually holds that the continuation of this exploitation retards the development and prosperity of the developing nations. Hence, globalization and modern capitalism benefit mostly the golden billion, while people in the so-called "developing" countries are getting the short end of the stick.

Counter-arguments 
Opponents of the concept often invoke market efficiency to argue that free trade and capitalism will make everybody wealthy eventually. Proponents counter that the ongoing process of multinational corporations channeling wealth from poorer countries to richer ones dictates that the gap will not diminish.

Available data indicates convergence of income for many developing countries. Some economists think that using latest data it is possible to conclude that the world now is in state of unconditional economic convergence. 

In his book The Ultimate Resource, Julian Simon offers the view that scarcity of physical resources can be overcome by the human mind. For example, the argument of scarcity of oil could be overcome by some of energy development strategies, such as use of synthetic fuels.

Modern estimations indicate that mineral shortages will not become a threat for many centuries

Concerning exploitation of the former colonies, Gregory Clark notes: "Yet generations of research by economic historians – David Landes, Deirdre McCloskey, and Joel Mokyr, among others – show that the wealth of the West was homegrown, the result of a stream of Western technological advances since the Industrial Revolution."

Application to the Russian invasion of Ukraine 
During Russia's 2022 war with Ukraine, the concept was used by leading Russian politicians to justify Russian policy and accuse the West of elitist colonialism. In May 2022, Nikolai Patrushev, secretary of the Security Council, accused "Anglo-Saxons" of "hiding their actions behind the human rights, freedom and democracy rhetoric," while pushing ahead "with the ‘golden billion’ doctrine, which implies that only select few are entitled to prosperity in this world." In June 2022, speaking at the International Economic Forum, Vladimir Putin "reiterated his position that the Kremlin was 'forced' to initiate the invasion of Ukraine [...] 'Our colleagues do not simply deny reality,' Putin added. 'They are trying to resist the course of history. They think in terms of the last century. They are in captivity of their own delusions about countries outside of the so-called golden billion, they see everything else as the periphery, their backyard, they treat these places as their colonies, and they treat the peoples living there as second-class citizens, because they consider themselves to be exceptional.'”

See also
First World
Capitalism
Globalization
New World Order
Free trade
Gapminder
North–South divide
Georgia Guidestones
Earth Summit

References

Global inequality
1990 neologisms
1990 establishments in Russia
Imperialism studies
World systems theory